Frank Walls may refer to:
 Frank Walls (illustrator), American illustrator and game designer
 Frank A. Walls, American serial killer

See also
 Frank Wall (disambiguation)